The UCI Mountain Bike World Championships are the world championship events for mountain bike racing in the disciplines of cross country, downhill, and four-cross. They are organized by the Union Cycliste Internationale (UCI), the governing body of world cycling.

The first three finishers in each discipline at the World Championships are awarded gold, silver, and bronze medals. The winner of each discipline is also entitled to wear the rainbow jersey in events of the same discipline until the following year's World Championships. Unlike other UCI-sanctioned mountain-bike races, the competitors in the World Championships represent national rather than commercial teams. The World Championships are usually held towards the end of the season.

History
The first UCI Mountain Bike World Championships took place in Durango, Colorado, USA in 1990 and featured only cross-country and downhill events. A separate UCI Trials World Championships had been held since 1986. From 2000 to 2016, the mountain bike and trials disciplines were combined and run as the UCI Mountain Bike & Trials World Championships. Beginning in 2017, the UCI world championships in trials will be run as part of the newly-created UCI Urban Cycling World Championships.

The cross-country team relay was added in 1999. The dual slalom was added in 2000 but replaced by four-cross in 2002. Mountain bike marathon was included on the schedule at the 2003 championships in Lugano, but run separately as the UCI Mountain Bike Marathon World Championships from 2004 onwards. The cross-country eliminator was introduced in 2012 but will be part of the UCI Urban Cycling World Championships from 2017 onwards. In 2014 and 2015 the four-cross events were held separately from the other disciplines as the UCI Four-Cross World Championships, but were again included alongside the other mountain-biking disciplines in 2016. The four-cross events were removed again after the 2021 edition.

Venues

World Eliminator Championships

World Championships 4-Cross

Events

UCI MTB World Champions
 Men's cross-country
 Women's cross-country
 Men's cross-country eliminator
 Women's cross-country eliminator
 Men's downhill
 Women's downhill
 Men's trials, 20 inch
 Men's trials, 26 inch
 Women's trials

See also
 UCI Mountain Bike & Trials World Championships
 UCI Mountain Bike Marathon World Championships
 UCI Trials World Championships
 UCI Urban Cycling World Championships
 UCI Mountain Bike World Eliminator Championships
 UCI Mountain Bike World 4-Cross Championships

References

External links

UCI mountain bike page
UCI Mountain Bike World Championships page

 
Mountain biking events
Mountain bike
Recurring sporting events established in 1990